"One Time 4 Your Mind" is the eighth song on Nas' debut album Illmatic. It is produced by Large Professor who provides the song with a mellow beat & a deep bassline. Nas raps two verses on the song and contributes to the call and response chorus with Grand Wizard (of Bravehearts). The song's lyrics deal with what Nas does in his leisure. Nas sampled a lyric from "One Time 4 Your Mind" on his song "Fetus". Termanology references a lyric from this song on "Stop, Look, Listen" by Statik Selektah. Steve Juon of RapReviews.com describes it as a "somber and slow-rolling banger." Marc Hill of PopMatters boasts the song's lyrics saying: "the laid back 'One Time 4 Your Mind' demonstrated a level of technical precision and rhetorical dexterity that [is] now requisite for inclusion among hip-hop's elite."

References

1994 songs
Nas songs
Song recordings produced by Large Professor
Songs written by Large Professor
Songs written by Nas
Jazz rap songs